Tapkeshwar Temple, also known as Tapkeshwar Mahadev Temple, is a temple in Dehradun dedicated to Shiva. The temple is on the bank of the Tons River and is built on top of a natural cave, which hold's the temple's main shivalinga.

History
The temple is alleged to be 6,000 years old. It has a natural shivalinga in the cave, which became a place of reverence for the local people. 

It is also believed that this was used as a residence by Guru Dronacharya, the teacher of the Pandavas and Kauravas in the Hindu epic Mahabharata; the cave is called Drone Cave after him. When Dronacharya's wife Kalyani gave birth to their son Aswosthama, she was unable to breastfeed him. As Dronacharya was unable to afford cow or cow milk, Aswosthama prayed to Shiva, who then fed him milk through dripping from the shivalinga in the cave.

Operations
The temple is popular as both a tourist destination and a pilgrimage site in Dehradun. Pilgrims bathe in the nearby sulphur-water springs before entering the temple.

Drona Cave, surrounded by hills, is a popular site for picnickers from Dehradun and nearby districts.

Events 
The temple hold a large festival on Shivratri. The temple committee organizes free meals for the devotees. 

Every year on Holi, a local theatre group, Hamari Pehchan, begins their holiday performance at the temple.

References

Hindu temples in Uttarakhand
Shiva temples in Uttarakhand
Tourist attractions in Dehradun
Buildings and structures in Dehradun